Ashley Michael Thorpe (born 2 April 1975) is an Australian former professional cricketer. He played as a left-handed batsman and right-arm medium-pace bowler for Durham County Cricket Club. He was born in Kiama, New South Wales but attended Kent Street Senior High School in Perth, Western Australia as part of their Specialist Cricket Program.

Thorpe, who began his career playing for Scarborough Cricket Club, represented Western Australia at Under 17 and Under 19 level. He moved to the United Kingdom in 1997 and made his mark in the North East Premier League First Division for Chester-le-Street. He trialled for a single match for Durham's Second XI during the 2001 season scoring 145 and 85 against Yorkshire Second XI, and made his debut for the first team in 2002, against a Sri Lankan touring team.

Despite his County Championship debut match ending in a heavy defeat at the hands of Glamorgan, Thorpe played six further matches during the season, none of which ended in victory.

Out of favour as a middle-order batsman in the following season, Thorpe played just two further first-class matches in 2003.

Having left Chester-le-Street and Durham County Cricket Club at the end of 2003, Thorpe was a club professional for Whitburn Cricket Club until 2008, when he joined Sunderland and later, Washington Cricket Club, where he remains as a respected player-coach.

Specialising in batting, he has been used by Durham to develop their young cricketers.

Thorpe now works for Durham Cricket as Head Coach of their Cricket Development Centre in partnership with Park View Academy of Sport. He is also a freelance commentator who often works for BBC Radio Newcastle covering Durham Cricket games.

1975 births
Living people
Australian cricketers
Durham cricketers
People educated at Kent Street Senior High School
Cricketers from Perth, Western Australia